Berchem-Sainte-Agathe (French) or Sint-Agatha-Berchem (Dutch), often simply called Berchem, is one of the 19 municipalities of the Brussels-Capital Region, Belgium. Located in the north-western part of the region, it is bordered by Ganshoren, Koekelberg and Molenbeek-Saint-Jean, as well as the Flemish municipalities of Asse and Dilbeek. In common with all of Brussels' municipalities, it is legally bilingual (French–Dutch).

, the municipality had a population of 25,298. The municipality is known for its calm and peaceful character. It is said that Berchem is a "village in the city".

History
In the Middle Ages, Berchem-Sainte-Agathe was a modest village on the edge of Brussels. In 1795, it received the status of an autonomous municipality. In 1841, it separated from neighbouring Koekelberg, and in 1954, it became a part of the Brussels-Capital Region.

Main sights
Berchem-Sainte-Agathe has a rich cultural and architectural heritage. Some of the main points of interest include:
 The former Church of St. Agatha, an old 12th-century Romanesque church. Completely renovated from 1972 to 1974, it is now deconsecrated and used for cultural ceremonies and celebrations.
 The Villa Marie-Mirande, an Art Nouveau house by the architect Victor Tinant
 The Cité Moderne, a housing project designed and built from 1922 to 1925 by the modernist architect Victor Bourgeois

Famous inhabitants
 David Lachterman (1934–1992), radio and television comedian and commentary expert
 Alexis Saelemaekers (b. 1999), football player who has played as a winger for R.S.C. Anderlecht and A.C. Milan
 Françoise Schepmans (b. 1960), politician and former mayor of Molenbeek, was born there.
 Jean-Claude Van Damme (b. 1960), actor and martial artist, was born there.
 Rudi Vervoort (b. 1958), politician and Minister-President of the Brussels-Capital Region, was born there.

See also
 Municipalities of the Brussels-Capital Region

References

Notes

External links

 
Municipalities of the Brussels-Capital Region
Populated places in Belgium